Audrehem is a commune in the Pas-de-Calais department in northern France.

History
The commune's name is of Germanic origin and dates back to at least the 9th century. It was written in Old Low Franconian as Aldomhem between 844 and 864 and again in 877, and as Aldenehem in 1164. Consisting of inflexions of the element alt "old" and the extremely common toponymic suffix hem "home, village", the literal translation would be "old home" or "old village".

Geography
The village is located 11 miles (18 km) northwest of Saint-Omer, at the junction of the D223 with the D217E road.

Population

Sights
 The fifteenth century church of St. Médard.
 The remains of the 15th century manor de Fouquesolles.

Personalities
Audrehem was the birthplace of Arnoul d'Audrehem (c.1305-1370), Marshal of France.

Louis Amadeus Rappe (February 2, 1801 - August 9, 1877) first bishop of Cleveland OH, is born in Audrehem in a farmer family. The street where we can find his birth house is now named in his remembrance.

See also
Communes of the Pas-de-Calais department

References

Communes of Pas-de-Calais